The Robe/Bonus Collection is a compilation album released by the hard rock band Ten. The double compact disc contains the third Ten studio album plus a separate disc of tracks previously released only in Japan.

Track listing
All songs written by Gary Hughes except where noted.

Disc one-The Robe

 "The Robe" – 9:05
 "Bright On the Blade" – 4:50
 "Standing On the Edge of Time" – 5:01 (Hughes/Vinny Burns)
 "Virtual Reality" – 5:48
 "Arcadia" – 7:34
 "Battlelines" – 4:17
 "You're In My Heart" – 6:38
 "Fly Like an Eagle" – 7:12
 "Ten Fathoms Deep" – 7:09
 "Someday" – 7:58 (Hughes/Burns)

Disc two-Bonus Collection

 "Warpath" – 3:51
 "Venus and Mars" – 4:34
 "Give Me a Piece of Your Heart" – 5:41 (Hughes/Burns)
 "If Only For a Day" – 8:11
 "Black Moon Rising" – 4:03
 "To Die For" – 4:33 (Hughes/Burns)
 "Close Your Eyes and Dream" (Live acoustic version) – 2:02
 "Turn Around" (Live acoustic version) – 1:37
 "Xanadu" – 4:55 (Hughes/Burns)
 "Rainbow In the Dark" – 4:52
 "We Rule the Night" (Acoustic version) – 5:18
 "Red" (Acoustic version) – 4:16
 "Till the End of Time" (Acoustic version) – 3:47

Personnel
Gary Hughes – vocals and programming
Vinny Burns – guitars and programming
Ged Rylands – keyboards
Greg Morgan – drums and percussion
John Halliwell – guitars
Andrew Webb – bass guitar
Jason Thanos – backing vocals
Ray Brophy – backing vocals and programming
Ed Collins – trumpet and flugelhorn
Dru Baker – tenor and alto saxophone
Dave Chadwick – Voiceovers

Production
Mixing – Mike Stone
Engineer – Ray Brophy
Additional Engineering – Audu Obaje, Tim Baxter and Royston Hollyer

Ten (band) albums
1999 compilation albums
Albums produced by Gary Hughes
Frontiers Records compilation albums